Malpelo may refer to:

Malpelo Island off Colombia's Pacific coast
Punta Malpelo, a point in Peru near the border with Ecuador.